Driven grouse shooting is the hunting of the red grouse, a field sport of the United Kingdom. The grouse-shooting season extends from 12 August, often called the "Glorious Twelfth", to 10 December each year. Large numbers of grouse are driven to fly over people with shotguns.  Driven grouse shooting first appeared around 1850 and became popular in the later Victorian era as a fashionable sport for the wealthy. The expanding rail network allowed relatively easy access into the remote upland areas of Britain for the first time and driven grouse shooting developed in tandem with this by providing shooting in a convenient and reliable form. Large numbers of birds are driven over a fixed position providing a regular supply of fast moving targets without the need to seek out the birds. The development of the breech-loading shotgun was also an essential ingredient in the development of the practice as it allowed more rapid reloading in the field matching the availability of target birds.

The alternative to a driven shoot is a walked-up shoot. In this form of shooting the participants walk forward in a line and flush the birds as they go, either themselves or with the assistance of specially trained dogs. The typical terrain and vegetation found on grouse moors means that walked-up shooting is more physically demanding than a driven shoot and requires some physical fitness. 

Shooting takes place on grouse moors, areas of moorland in Scotland, northern England, and Wales. These areas, some 16,763 square kilometres in extent (about 8% of the combined area of England and Scotland) form an artificial habitat that is intensively managed, usually by regular burning, to provide a constant supply of young heather and to prevent the spread of trees and grass. Predators and mountain hares are also killed. These practices have been described as not just precluding birds of prey, but also preventing wildness, natural landscapes, forest and bog regeneration, and ecotourism.

Description
The red grouse is a medium-sized bird of the grouse family or subfamily which is found in heather moorland in Great Britain and Ireland. It is usually classified as a subspecies of the willow grouse, but is sometimes considered to be a separate species Lagopus scoticus, found only in the British Isles. It is also known as the moorfowl or moorbird. They make difficult targets, but on a specially managed moor where they are driven in large numbers over prepared butts, even amateur shooters can kill large numbers. The name "driven grouse shooting" refers to the way in which the grouse are driven towards the hunters (otherwise known as 'Guns') by beaters. A code of conduct governs behaviour on the grouse moor for both safety and etiquette. 

Grouse moors have been described as "the ultimate trophy asset... one of the ultimate playthings, for which people will pay well over the asset value." 

Grouse shooting can also be undertaken by 'walking up' grouse over pointers, or by flushing the birds with other dogs. 

In southern Sweden, this form of hunting is called fjälljakt; the corresponding biome is not managed by burning, but consists of a wooded mosaic, with heather, trees, lakes and bogland. Its management by, in particular, large wild herbivores such as moose maintains this mosaic as a stable condition, with modest populations of grouse (often hidden from predators in willow thickets) and a rich variety of other species.

Moorland management

Draining

Large areas of grouse moor were previously blanket bogs, where sphagnum moss is the dominant vegetation, and drainage is required to allow heather to flourish. Both drainage and burning damage these bogs.

Burning
To support a large population of grouse, gamekeepers burn heather, between 1 October and 15 April. A burned patch of heather allows fresh shoots to come through which are ideal nutrition for grouse and prevents the build up of dry plant matter. Burning also kills tree and grass regrowth. Burning is done in patches so that there is a variety of heather heights, on a rotation of between 8 and 12 years. While the short new shoots provide food, the taller, older heather provides cover and shelter for the grouse. Heather moorland is an unusual habitat worldwide, almost all un-natural, the result of management by burning for grouse. (The claim that 75% of the world's heather moorland is found in the UK is contested and has been shown to be unsubstantiated.) 60% of all England's upland Sites of Special Scientific Interest are managed for grouse shooting. UK moorlands and blanket bogs are a carbon sink and burning heather releases this carbon, although some of the charcoal from burned heather is stored in the soil. 

Heather burning on moorland has significant negative impacts on peat hydrology, peat chemistry and physical properties, river water chemistry and river ecology. Moor burning reduces Sphagnum moss growth and the density of macroinvertebrates which play a vital role in aquatic food webs by feeding on algae, microbes and detritus at the base of food chains before they themselves are consumed by birds, fish and amphibians. Burning also reduces the water content of the upper layers of peat, so the peat is less able to retain minerals which are important for plant growth and resist acid rain. 

To minimize the damage, some moorland estates managed for grouse shooting have agreed not to burn over protected blanket bogs, where fires dry and burn the peat. However, some burning of these areas continues. If a moorland is not burned over for several years, large stands of rank and woody heather build up, posing a risk of major fires due to the large fuel loads. Larger wildfires burn with greater intensity and may be more likely to burn the peat beneath. This risk is limited to long-established, unnatural heather moorland that is actively burned; wildfires are very rare in the corresponding mosaic biome of southern Sweden.

Mowing 
Trials of mechanical mowing have been made to achieve the same objective of regeneration of heather. Mowing produces only one-seventieth as much overall carbon dioxide emissions as burning but costs approximately six times more.

Killing predators
Grouse moors have a near-200 year history of killing large numbers of predators, including many species that are now protected. Burning and predator control correlate with higher densities of red grouse, and also of a few other species that are able to thrive on open heather moors; golden plover, curlew, lapwing, common redshank and ring ouzel. The RSPB's Investigations Team reports that in 2017, despite vast swathes of suitable habitat, not a single hen harrier chick was produced on a privately owned grouse moor. Illegal killing of raptors on grouse moors is widespread.

A 2017 study commissioned by Scottish Natural Heritage into the fate of satellite-tracked golden eagles concluded that "Corroborative information points to the perpetrators of the persecution of tagged eagles being associated with some grouse moors in the central and eastern Highlands of Scotland," and that "[t]his illegal killing has such a marked effect on the survival rates of the young birds that the potential capacity for the breeding golden eagle population continues to be suppressed around where this persecution largely occurs."

The Langholm Moor Demonstration Project prevented the persecution of raptors, especially hen harriers, and found that grouse would survive in the presence of a more natural number of predators. However, raptor predation at Langholm reduced autumn grouse abundance by 50%, making organized driven grouse shooting unprofitable. A community land project now hopes to purchase much of the land in question. The Langholm experiment suggests that, to be profitable, intensive grouse moors require predators to be persecuted. The RSPB reports that there seems to be a "background of illegal persecution" of raptors on British grouse moors.

Shooting and poisoning are not the only methods of killing predators. Snares placed to trap foxes have injured humans. Illegal snares have been used to kill predators on grouse moors. Spring and rail traps are widely used and can kill a variety of protected species.

In November 2020, the Scottish government announced that self-regulation and attempts at suppression of undesirable practices had failed. The government intends to start drafting new legislation that will impose a strict licensing regime on Scottish grouse moors, controlling raptor persecution, the burning of moorland, and mass medication with medicated grit. A joint industry statement said that Scotland already had the UK’s strictest anti-persecution measures and incidents were declining, and further regulation risked closing down grouse moors, with economic loss to gamekeepers and vulnerable rural businesses.

Killing mountain hares

Mountain hares may be hosts for ticks and for louping ill virus, both of which they can share with red grouse (and with deer). In order to control tick-borne disease, some game managers have recommended killing mountain hares. The only study that has been used to support this policy had no meaningful control group, used potentially confounding treatments, and there were no deer in the study area. A recent study found no effects of mountain hare abundance on number of ticks on grouse, and actually found better grouse chick survival in areas with greater numbers of mountain hares. The Scottish Parliament voted in June 2020 to protect mountain hares; it will be an offence under the Wildlife and Countryside Act to intentionally or recklessly kill or injure a hare without a licence.

Economics and employment

Grouse shooting supports the equivalent of 2,592 full-time jobs in England, Wales and Scotland, some 1,772 actually managing moors. The Moorland Association estimates the total economic value of the grouse-shooting industry at some £67 million per year. However, this is supported by millions of pounds in subsidies. The small village of Blanchland, Northumberland (population 140) is a centre for grouse shooting in England; 55 per cent of its inhabitants are either directly or indirectly involved in grouse shooting.

Grouse shooting is not directly eligible for government subsidy; however, the land over which it takes place is considered to be agricultural grazing land and therefore eligible for the Basic Farm Payment. The total government funding paid to grouse moor owners is therefore hard to estimate accurately. Estimates have circulated in the press as high as £85 million but a more realistic assessment is around £11 million in 2018.

The profitability of grouse shooting is under threat from both climate and disease.  There has been a long-term decline in red grouse numbers.  Weather conditions in recent years have resulted in shortages of grouse, to the extent that grouse shooting has had to be cancelled in some locations.  This has led landowners in upland areas to substitute pheasant and partridge shooting for grouse shooting, with an increased risk of disease spreading from rear-and-release pheasants and partridge to nearby red grouse.

Opposition to driven grouse shooting
The practices associated with driven grouse shooting have been criticised by many conservation bodies for harming moorland habitats and for illegally persecuting predators, particularly the hen harrier, which preys on grouse chicks. The RSPB has called for shoots to be licensed, and former RSPB Conservation Director Dr Mark Avery raised a petition calling for a ban on the practice. By its closure on 21 September 2016 the petition had attracted 123,077 signatures, triggering a parliamentary debate on the practice, held in Westminster Hall on 31 October 2016.  "Because most of our birds evolved in wooded mosaic habitats, grouse moors, being burned and treeless, with just a fraction of native food plants, stifle most wildlife – most of the time."

Alternative land uses
The main alternatives proposed are:

Rewilding, with ecotourism
The Revive coalition describes Scotland's grouse moors as "impoverished" and suggests that an increase in woodland and scrub cover and reinstatement of functioning bogs could result in an upland landscape composed of a mosaic of different woodland, scrub and open habitats. This would support a greater abundance and diversity of wildlife, supply improved ecosystem services, be more resilient to environmental change, pests and diseases, and provide diverse resources and sources of income for local people. 

However, rewilding has been opposed by shooting organizations. The chief executive of Scottish Land and Estates, which represents many grouse moor owners, said: “It is recommending a complete change in the landscape of Scotland. The bonnie purple heather will give way to an unmanaged vista of scrub and scarce wildlife.”

In recent years a few large estates including grouse moors have been managed for the re-establishment of a more natural mosaic of habitats. Ecotourism is often a component, and ongoing shooting, especially of deer which prevent tree regrowth and in modern Britain have no natural predators, is often essential. The Mar Lodge Estate aims to regenerate woodland including Caledonian forest. Cairngorms Connect has a 200-year vision, to restore woodland to its natural limit, including high altitude montane woodlands; restore blanket bog and forest bogs, and restore natural processes to river floodplains. These restoration projects are intended to deliver benefits to people: reducing flood-risk, storing carbon, and providing homes for wildlife, as well as great places for people to visit. Anders Holch Povlsen's "Wildland" plans for his Scottish estate, some 390 square kilometres in 2019, include restoring their parts of the Highlands "to their former magnificent natural state and repair the harm that man has inflicted on them". This vision includes not just the land itself, but also its many vulnerable buildings and communities. The Rothiemurchus Forest has not been managed for grouse and presents a patchwork of woods, bogs, and heather with rich wildlife. Alladale Wilderness Reserve, Creag Meagaidh, and Glen Affric are further examples of successful management of Scottish wildlife. Scottish Natural Heritage estimates that nature-based tourism in Scotland was worth £1.4 billion and supported 39,000 jobs in 2018.

Intensive production of timber
Plantations of Sitka spruce are almost the only form of intensive forestry that are economically practical in much of upland Britain – though not on all of it. They support only very limited wildlife.

Minimal management, sheep grazing
A former grouse moor in Berwyn, Wales, was allowed to fall out of management in the 1990s. As the area was not managed to restore its natural rich mosaic of habitats, heather was replaced by rank, ungrazed grass, few species replaced the grouse, and predators (especially crows and foxes) flourished. The species specifically favoured by grouse moor management did particularly badly: within 20 years, lapwing became extinct at the site, golden plover declined by 90 per cent, and curlew declined by 79 per cent.

References

External links

Bird hunting
Grouse
Hunting and shooting in the United Kingdom
Land management in the United Kingdom